Lagos Kunga (born October 20, 1998) is an American soccer player who currently plays for Al Khums in the Libyan Premier League.

Early life 
Kunga was born in Angola before his family moved to Russia, where they lived until he was seven years old. They later moved to Clarkston, Georgia in the United States.

Professional career 
At the youth level, Kunga developed at DDYSC in Atlanta and played varsity soccer at The Paideia School. Kunga had initially stated a commitment to play college soccer at Furman University.

Atlanta United
It was announced on June 17, 2017, that Kunga would sign with Major League Soccer side Atlanta United as a Homegrown Player at the beginning of the 2018 season.

On June 28, 2017, Kunga signed with United Soccer League side Charleston Battery, the USL affiliate of Atlanta United, until the end of their 2017 season. He was immediately sent on a short-term loan deal to Atlanta and made an appearance on the same day as a 65th-minute substitute in 3–2 loss to Miami FC in the U.S. Open Cup.

On March 24, 2018, Kunga made his first official appearance for Atlanta United on their second team, Atlanta United 2. Kunga started the game, and was subbed off after 86 minutes.

On the last day of the USL regular season, October 13, 2018, Kunga scored a brace against the Richmond Kickers in a 3–2 victory to finish off the season with 5 goals in 31 appearances.

Following the 2020 season, Kunga was released by Atlanta on November 24, 2020.

Memphis 901 (loan)
Kunga was loaned to Memphis 901 in the USL Championship. Kunga made 20 appearances scoring one goal.

Phoenix Rising (loan)
On January 21, 2020, Kunga was loaned to USL Championship club Phoenix Rising FC.

Kalonji Pro-Profile
After being released from Phoenix Rising FC following the 2020 USL Championship season, Kunga returned to Georgia to play with United Premier Soccer League club Kalonji Pro-Profile.

Kristiansund BK
On August 29, 2021, Kunga signed with Eliteserien club Kristiansund BK.

Kalonji Pro-Profile
Kunga returned to Kalonji Pro-Profile in 2022. He scored in Kalonji's United Premier Soccer League National Third Place match against the Los Angeles FC Academy.

Al Khums SC
In September 2022, Kunga signed Libyan Premier League side Al Khums SC.

Statistics

References

External links

 

1998 births
Living people
Footballers from Luanda
Sportspeople from DeKalb County, Georgia
American soccer players
United States men's under-20 international soccer players
United States men's youth international soccer players
Angolan footballers
American people of Angolan descent
African-American soccer players
Sportspeople of Angolan descent
Angolan expatriates in Russia
Angolan emigrants to the United States
Association football forwards
Atlanta United FC players
Atlanta United 2 players
Charleston Battery players
Homegrown Players (MLS)
Memphis 901 FC players
Phoenix Rising FC players
Kristiansund BK players
People from Clarkston, Georgia
Soccer players from Georgia (U.S. state)
USL Championship players
United Premier Soccer League players
American expatriate sportspeople in Norway
Expatriate footballers in Norway
American expatriate soccer players
American expatriate sportspeople in Libya
Angolan expatriates in Libya